Genesee Generating Station is a coal fired station owned by Capital Power Corporation, located near Genesee, Alberta, Canada; 71 km (44 miles) southwest of Edmonton, Alberta.  Fuel is provided by the nearby coal mine, a joint venture of EPCOR and Westmoreland Prairie Resources. The Genesee cooling pond is a reservoir  covering . The pond is topped up with water from the North Saskatchewan River.

The station consists of three units.

Description 
The Genesee Generating Station consists of:
 G1 - one 400 net MW unit (commissioned in May 1994)
 G2 - one 400 net MW unit (commissioned in October 1989)
 G3 - one 466 net MW unit (commissioned in March 2005)

The boilers were supplied by Combustion Engineering/Hitachi while the turbines/generator are supplied by GEC/Hitachi. The plant has two smokestacks, one 138 m (453 ft) tall, the other 121 m (397 ft) tall.

Conversion to natural gas
On 18 June 2019, Capital Power announced plans to expand the "dual-fuel" capabilities of all three units to running off 50% coal and 50% natural gas, with the intent to convert the power station to 100% natural gas use by 2030. Capital Power submitted applications in 2020 and received approval from the AUC and AEP in 2021 to convert Units 1 and 2 to Natural Gas Combined Cycle technology by 2024. The project also includes addition of a 210 MW Battery Energy Storage System (BESS).  Unit 3 was converted to a 60/40 ratio of coal to natural gas in spring 2021 and will be converted to enable 100% gas firing in 2023.

See also

 List of largest power stations in Canada
 List of coal-fired power stations in Canada
 List of tallest smokestacks in Canada

References 

Coal-fired power stations in Alberta
Leduc County
1989 establishments in Alberta
North Saskatchewan River
Energy infrastructure completed in 1989